Sexually transmitted infections (STIs), also referred to as sexually transmitted diseases (STDs) and the older term venereal diseases, are infections that are spread by sexual activity, especially vaginal intercourse, anal sex, and oral sex. STIs often do not initially cause symptoms, which results in a risk of passing the infection on to others. Symptoms and signs of STIs may include vaginal discharge, penile discharge, ulcers on or around the genitals, and pelvic pain.  Some STIs can cause infertility.

Bacterial STIs include chlamydia, gonorrhea, and syphilis. Viral STIs include genital herpes, HIV/AIDS, and genital warts. Parasitic STIs include trichomoniasis. STI diagnostic tests are usually easily available in the developed world, but they are often unavailable in the developing world.

Some vaccinations may also decrease the risk of certain infections including hepatitis B and some types of HPV. Safe sex practices, such as use of condoms, having a smaller number of sexual partners, and being in a relationship in which each person only has sex with the other also decreases the risk of STIs. Comprehensive sex education may also be useful. Most STIs are treatable and curable; of the most common infections, syphilis, gonorrhea, chlamydia, and trichomoniasis are curable, while HIV/AIDS and genital herpes are not curable.

In 2015, about 1.1 billion people had STIs other than HIV/AIDS. About 500 million were infected with either syphilis, gonorrhea, chlamydia or trichomoniasis. At least an additional 530 million people have genital herpes, and 290 million women have human papillomavirus. STIs other than HIV resulted in 108,000 deaths in 2015. In the United States, there were 19 million new cases of STIs in 2010. Historical documentation of STIs in antiquity dates back to at least the Ebers Papyrus and the Hebrew Bible/Old Testament (8th/7th centuries BCE).

There is often shame and stigma associated with STIs. The term sexually transmitted infection is generally preferred over sexually transmitted disease or venereal disease, as it includes those who do not have symptomatic disease.

Signs and symptoms

Not all STIs are symptomatic, and symptoms may not appear immediately after infection. In some instances a disease can be carried with no symptoms, which leaves a greater risk of passing the disease on to others. Depending on the disease, some untreated STIs can lead to infertility, chronic pain or death.

The presence of an STI in prepubescent children may indicate sexual abuse.

Cause

Transmission
A sexually transmitted infection present in a pregnant woman may be passed on to the infant before or after birth.

Bacterial 
 Chancroid (Haemophilus ducreyi)
 Chlamydia (Chlamydia trachomatis)
 Gonorrhea (Neisseria gonorrhoeae)
 Granuloma inguinale or (Klebsiella granulomatis)
 Mycoplasma genitalium
 Mycoplasma hominis
 Syphilis (Treponema pallidum)
 Ureaplasma infection

Viral 

 Viral hepatitis (hepatitis B virus)—saliva, venereal fluids.(Note: hepatitis A and hepatitis E are transmitted via the fecal-oral route; hepatitis C is rarely sexually transmittable, and the route of transmission of hepatitis D (only if infected with B) is uncertain, but may include sexual transmission.)
 Herpes simplex (Herpes simplex virus 1, 2) skin and mucosal, transmissible with or without visible blisters
 HIV (Human Immunodeficiency Virus)—venereal fluids, semen, breast milk, blood
 HPV (Human Papillomavirus)—skin and mucosal contact. 'High risk' types of HPV cause almost all cervical cancers, as well as some anal, penile, and vulvar cancer. Some other types of HPV cause genital warts.
 Molluscum contagiosum (molluscum contagiosum virus MCV)—close contact
 Zika virus

Parasites 
 Crab louse, colloquially known as "crabs" or "pubic lice" (Pthirus pubis). The infestation and accompanying inflammation is Pediculosis pubis
 Scabies (Sarcoptes scabiei)
 Trichomoniasis (Trichomonas vaginalis), colloquially known as "trich"

Main types
Sexually transmitted infections include:
 Chlamydia is a sexually transmitted infection caused by the bacterium Chlamydia trachomatis. In women, symptoms may include abnormal vaginal discharge, burning during urination, and bleeding in between periods, although most women do not experience any symptoms. Symptoms in men include pain when urinating, and abnormal discharge from their penis. If left untreated in both men and women, chlamydia can infect the urinary tract and potentially lead to pelvic inflammatory disease (PID). PID can cause serious problems during pregnancy and even has the potential to cause infertility. It can cause a woman to have a potentially deadly ectopic pregnancy, in which the egg implants outside of the uterus. However, chlamydia can be cured with antibiotics.
 The two most common forms of herpes are caused by infection with herpes simplex virus (HSV). HSV-1 is typically acquired orally and causes cold sores, HSV-2 is usually acquired during sexual contact and affects the genitals, however, either strain may affect either site. Some people are asymptomatic or have very mild symptoms. Those that do experience symptoms usually notice them 2 to 20 days after exposure which lasts 2 to 4 weeks. Symptoms can include small fluid-filled blisters, headaches, backaches, itching or tingling sensations in the genital or anal area, pain during urination, flu like symptoms, swollen glands, or fever. Herpes is spread through skin contact with a person infected with the virus. The virus affects the areas where it entered the body. This can occur through kissing, vaginal intercourse, oral sex or anal sex. The virus is most infectious during times when there are visible symptoms, however, those who are asymptomatic can still spread the virus through skin contact. The initial infection and symptoms are usually the most severe because the body does not have any antibodies built up. After the primary attack, one might have recurring attacks that are milder or might not even have future attacks. There is no cure for the disease but there are antiviral medications that treat its symptoms and lower the risk of transmission (Valtrex). Although HSV-1 is typically the "oral" version of the virus, and HSV-2 is typically the "genital" version of the virus, a person with HSV-1 orally CAN transmit that virus to their partner genitally. The virus, either type, will settle into a nerve bundle either at the top of the spine, producing the "oral" outbreak, or a second nerve bundle at the base of the spine, producing the genital outbreak.
 The human papillomavirus (HPV) is the most common STI in the United States. There are more than 40 different strands of HPV and many do not cause any health problems. In 90% of cases, the body's immune system clears the infection naturally within two years. Some cases may not be cleared and can lead to genital warts (bumps around the genitals that can be small or large, raised or flat, or shaped like cauliflower) or cervical cancer and other HPV related cancers. Symptoms might not show up until advanced stages. It is important for women to get pap smears in order to check for and treat cancers. There are also two vaccines available for women (Cervarix and Gardasil) that protect against the types of HPV that cause cervical cancer. HPV can be passed through genital-to-genital contact as well as during oral sex. The infected partner might not have any symptoms.
 Gonorrhea is caused by bacterium that lives on moist mucous membranes in the urethra, vagina, rectum, mouth, throat, and eyes. The infection can spread through contact with the penis, vagina, mouth, or anus. Symptoms of gonorrhea usually appear two to five days after contact with an infected partner however, some men might not notice symptoms for up to a month. Symptoms in men include burning and pain while urinating, increased urinary frequency, discharge from the penis (white, green, or yellow in color), red or swollen urethra, swollen or tender testicles, or sore throat. Symptoms in women may include vaginal discharge, burning or itching while urinating, painful sexual intercourse, severe pain in lower abdomen (if infection spreads to fallopian tubes), or fever (if infection spreads to fallopian tubes); however, many women do not show any symptoms. Antibiotic resistant strains of Gonorrhea are a significant concern, but most cases can be cured with existing antibiotics.

 Syphilis is an STI caused by a bacterium. Untreated, it can lead to complications and death. Clinical manifestations of syphilis include the ulceration of the uro-genital tract, mouth or rectum; if left untreated the symptoms worsen. In recent years, the prevalence of syphilis has declined in Western Europe, but it has increased in Eastern Europe (former Soviet states). A high incidence of syphilis can be found in places such as Cameroon, Cambodia, Papua New Guinea. Syphilis infections are increasing in the United States.
 Trichomoniasis is a common STI that is caused by infection with a protozoan parasite called Trichomonas vaginalis. Trichomoniasis affects both women and men, but symptoms are more common in women. Most patients are treated with an antibiotic called metronidazole, which is very effective.
 HIV (human immunodeficiency virus) damages the body's immune system, which interferes with its ability to fight off disease-causing agents. The virus kills CD4 cells, which are white blood cells that help fight off various infections. HIV is carried in body fluids and is spread by sexual activity. It can also be spread by contact with infected blood, breastfeeding, childbirth, and from mother to child during pregnancy. When HIV is at its most advanced stage, an individual is said to have AIDS (acquired immunodeficiency syndrome). There are different stages of the progression of and HIV infection. The stages include primary infection, asymptomatic infection, symptomatic infection, and AIDS. In the primary infection stage, an individual will have flu-like symptoms (headache, fatigue, fever, muscle aches) for about two weeks. In the asymptomatic stage, symptoms usually disappear, and the patient can remain asymptomatic for years. When HIV progresses to the symptomatic stage, the immune system is weakened and has a low cell count of CD4+ T cells. When the HIV infection becomes life-threatening, it is called AIDS. People with AIDS fall prey to opportunistic infections and die as a result. When the disease was first discovered in the 1980s, those who had AIDS were not likely to live longer than a few years. There are now antiretroviral drugs (ARVs) available to treat HIV infections. There is no known cure for HIV or AIDS but the drugs help suppress the virus. By suppressing the amount of virus in the body, people can lead longer and healthier lives. Even though their virus levels may be low they can still spread the virus to others.

Viruses in semen

Twenty-seven different viruses have been identified in semen. Information on whether or not transmission occurs or whether the viruses cause disease is uncertain. Some of these microbes are known to be sexually transmitted.

Pathophysiology 

Many STIs are (more easily) transmitted through the mucous membranes of the penis, vulva, rectum, urinary tract and (less often—depending on type of infection) the mouth, throat, respiratory tract and eyes. The visible membrane covering the head of the penis is a mucous membrane, though it produces no mucus (similar to the lips of the mouth). Mucous membranes differ from skin in that they allow certain pathogens into the body. The amount of contact with infective sources which causes infection varies with each pathogen but in all cases, a disease may result from even light contact from fluid carriers like venereal fluids onto a mucous membrane.

Some STIs such as HIV can be transmitted from mother to child either during pregnancy or breastfeeding.
Healthcare professionals suggest safer sex, such as the use of condoms, as a reliable way of decreasing the risk of contracting sexually transmitted diseases during sexual activity, but safer sex cannot be considered to provide complete protection from an STI. The transfer of and exposure to bodily fluids, such as blood transfusions and other blood products, sharing injection needles, needle-stick injuries (when medical staff are inadvertently jabbed or pricked with needles during medical procedures), sharing tattoo needles, and childbirth are other avenues of transmission. These different means put certain groups, such as medical workers, and haemophiliacs and drug users, particularly at risk.

It is possible to be an asymptomatic carrier of sexually transmitted diseases. In particular, sexually transmitted diseases in women often cause the serious condition of pelvic inflammatory disease.

Diagnosis

Testing may be for a single infection, or consist of a number of tests for a range of STIs, including tests for syphilis, trichomonas, gonorrhea, chlamydia, herpes, hepatitis, and HIV. No procedure tests for all infectious agents.

STI tests may be used for a number of reasons:
 as a diagnostic test to determine the cause of symptoms or illness
 as a screening test to detect asymptomatic or presymptomatic infections
 as a check that prospective sexual partners are free of disease before they engage in sex without safer sex precautions (for example, when starting a long term mutually monogamous sexual relationship, in fluid bonding, or for procreation).
 as a check prior to or during pregnancy, to prevent harm to the baby
 as a check after birth, to check that the baby has not caught an STI from the mother
 to prevent the use of infected donated blood or organs
 as part of the process of contact tracing from a known infected individual
 as part of mass epidemiological surveillance

Early identification and treatment results in less chance to spread disease, and for some conditions may improve the outcomes of treatment. There is often a window period after initial infection during which an STI test will be negative. During this period, the infection may be transmissible. The duration of this period varies depending on the infection and the test. Diagnosis may also be delayed by reluctance of the infected person to seek a medical professional. One report indicated that people turn to the Internet rather than to a medical professional for information on STIs to a higher degree than for other sexual problems.

Classification 

Until the 1990s, STIs were commonly known as venereal diseases, an antiquated euphemism derived from the Latin , being the adjectival form of Venus, the Roman goddess of love. However, in the post-classical education era the euphemistic effect was entirely lost, and the common abbreviation "VD" held only negative connotations. Other former euphemisms for STIs include "blood diseases" and "social diseases". The present euphemism is in the use of the initials "STI" rather than in the words they represent. The World Health Organization (WHO) has recommended the more inclusive term sexually transmitted infection since 1999. Public health officials originally introduced the term sexually transmitted infection, which clinicians are increasingly using alongside the term sexually transmitted disease in order to distinguish it from the former.

Prevention 

Strategies for reducing STI risk include: vaccination, mutual monogamy, reducing the number of sexual partners, and abstinence. Also potentially helpful is behavioral counseling for sexually active adolescents and for adults who are at increased risk. Such interactive counseling, which can be resource-intensive, is directed at a person's risk, the situations in which risk occurs, and the use of personalized goal-setting strategies.

The most effective way to prevent sexual transmission of STIs is to avoid contact of body parts or fluids which can lead to transfer with an infected partner. Not all sexual activities involve contact: cybersex, phone sex or masturbation from a distance are methods of avoiding contact. Proper use of condoms reduces contact and risk. Although a condom is effective in limiting exposure, some disease transmission may occur even with a condom.Both partners can get tested for STIs before initiating sexual contact, or before resuming contact if a partner engaged in contact with someone else. Many infections are not detectable immediately after exposure, so enough time must be allowed between possible exposures and testing for the tests to be accurate. Certain STIs, particularly certain persistent viruses like HPV, may be impossible to detect.

Some treatment facilities use in-home test kits and have the person return the test for follow-up. Other facilities strongly encourage that those previously infected return to ensure that the infection has been eliminated. Novel strategies to foster re-testing have been the use of text messaging and email as reminders. These types of reminders are now used in addition to phone calls and letters. After obtaining a sexual history, a healthcare provider can encourage risk reduction by providing prevention counseling. Prevention counseling is most effective if provided in a nonjudgmental and empathetic manner appropriate to the person's culture, language, gender, sexual orientation, age, and developmental level. Prevention counseling for STIs is usually offered to all sexually active adolescents and to all adults who have received a diagnosis, have had an STI in the past year, or have multiple sex partners.

Vaccines 

Vaccines are available that protect against some viral STIs, such as hepatitis A, hepatitis B, and some types of HPV. Vaccination before initiation of sexual contact is advised to assure maximal protection. The development of vaccines to protect against gonorrhea is ongoing.

Condoms 

Condoms and female condoms only provide protection when used properly as a barrier, and only to and from the area that they cover. Uncovered areas are still susceptible to many STIs.

In the case of HIV, sexual transmission routes almost always involve the penis, as HIV cannot spread through unbroken skin; therefore, properly shielding the penis with a properly worn condom from the vagina or anus effectively stops HIV transmission. An infected fluid to broken skin borne direct transmission of HIV would not be considered "sexually transmitted", but can still theoretically occur during sexual contact. This can be avoided simply by not engaging in sexual contact when presenting open, bleeding wounds.

Other STIs, even viral infections, can be prevented with the use of latex, polyurethane or polyisoprene condoms as a barrier. Some microorganisms and viruses are small enough to pass through the pores in natural skin condoms but are still too large to pass through latex or synthetic condoms.

Proper male condom usage entails:
 Not putting the condom on too tight at the tip by leaving  room for ejaculation. Putting the condom on too tightly can and often does lead to failure.
 Wearing a condom too loose can defeat the barrier
 Avoiding inverting or spilling a condom once worn, whether it has ejaculate in it or not
 If a user attempts to unroll the condom, but realizes they have it on the wrong side, then this condom may not be effective
 Being careful with the condom if handling it with long nails
 Avoiding the use of oil-based lubricants (or anything with oil in it) with latex condoms, as oil can eat holes into them
 Using flavored condoms for oral sex only, as the sugar in the flavoring can lead to yeast infections if used to penetrate

In order to best protect oneself and the partner from STIs, the old condom and its contents are to be treated as infectious and properly disposed of. A new condom is used for each act of intercourse, as multiple usages increase the chance of breakage, defeating the effectiveness as a barrier.

In the case of female condoms, the device consists of two rings, one in each terminal portion. The larger ring should fit snugly over the cervix and the smaller ring remains outside the vagina, covering the vulva. This system provides some protection of the external genitalia.

Other 

The cap was developed after the cervical diaphragm. Both cover the cervix and the main difference between the diaphragm and the cap is that the latter must be used only once, using a new one in each sexual act. The diaphragm, however, can be used more than once. These two devices partially protect against STIs (they do not protect against HIV).

Researchers had hoped that nonoxynol-9, a vaginal microbicide would help decrease STI risk.  Trials, however, have found it ineffective and it may put women at a higher risk of HIV infection. There is evidence that vaginal dapivirine probably reduces HIV in women who have sex with men, other types of vaginal microbicides have not demonstrated effectiveness for HIV or STI's.

There is little evidence that school-based interventions such as sexual and reproductive health education programmes on contraceptive choices and condoms are effective on improving the sexual and reproductive health of adolescents. Incentive-based programmes may reduce adolescent pregnancy but more data is needed to confirm this.

Screening
Specific age groups, persons who participate in risky sexual behavior, or those have certain health conditions may require screening. The CDC recommends that sexually active women under the age of 25 and those over 25 at risk should be screened for chlamydia and gonorrhea yearly. Appropriate times for screening are during regular pelvic examinations and preconception evaluations. Nucleic acid amplification tests are the recommended method of diagnosis for gonorrhea and chlamydia. This can be done on either urine in both men and women, vaginal or cervical swabs in women, or urethral swabs in men. Screening can be performed:
 to assess the presence of infection and prevent tubal infertility in women
 during the initial evaluation before infertility treatment
 to identify HIV infection
 for men who have sex with men
 for those who may have been exposed to hepatitis C
 for HCV

Management 

In the case of rape, the person can be treated prophylacticly with antibiotics.

An option for treating partners of patients (index cases) diagnosed with chlamydia or gonorrhea is patient-delivered partner therapy, which is the clinical practice of treating the sex partners of index cases by providing prescriptions or medications to the patient to take to his/her partner without the health care provider first examining the partner. In term of preventing reinfection in sexually transmitted infection, treatment with both patient and the sexual partner of patient resulted in more successful than treatment of the patient without the sexual partner. There is no difference in reinfection prevention whether the sexual partner treated with medication without medical examination or after notification by patient.

Epidemiology 

In 2008, it was estimated that 500 million people were infected with either syphilis, gonorrhea, chlamydia or trichomoniasis. At least an additional 530 million people have genital herpes and 290 million women have human papillomavirus. STIs other than HIV resulted in 142,000 deaths in 2013. In the United States there were 19 million new cases of sexually transmitted infections in 2010.

In 2010, 19 million new cases of sexually transmitted infections occurred in women in the United States. A 2008 CDC study found that 25–40% of U.S. teenage girls has a sexually transmitted disease. Out of a population of almost 295,270,000 people there were 110 million new and existing cases of eight sexually transmitted infections.

Over 400,000 sexually transmitted infections were reported in England in 2017, about the same as in 2016, but there were more than 20% increases in confirmed cases of gonorrhoea and syphilis. Since 2008 syphilis cases have risen by 148%, from 2,874 to 7,137, mostly among men who have sex with men.  The number of first cases of genital warts in 2017 among girls aged 15–17 years was just 441, 90% less than in 2009 – attributed to the national human papilloma virus immunisation programme.

AIDS is among the leading causes of death in present-day Sub-Saharan Africa. HIV/AIDS is transmitted primarily via unprotected sexual intercourse. More than 1.1 million persons are living with HIV/AIDS in the United States, and it disproportionately impacts African Americans. Hepatitis B is also considered a sexually transmitted disease because it can be spread through sexual contact. The highest rates are found in Asia and Africa and lower rates are in the Americas and Europe. Approximately two billion people worldwide have been infected with the hepatitis B virus.

History 

The first well-recorded European outbreak of what is now known as syphilis occurred in 1494 when it broke out among French troops besieging Naples in the Italian War of 1494–98. The disease may have originated from the Columbian Exchange. From Naples, the disease swept across Europe, killing more than five million people. As Jared Diamond describes it, "[W]hen syphilis was first definitely recorded in Europe in 1495, its pustules often covered the body from the head to the knees, caused flesh to fall from people's faces, and led to death within a few months," rendering it far more fatal than it is today. Diamond concludes,"[B]y 1546, the disease had evolved into the disease with the symptoms so well known to us today." Gonorrhea is recorded at least up to 700 years ago and associated with a district in Paris formerly known as "Le Clapiers". This is where the prostitutes were to be found at that time.

Prior to the invention of modern medicines, sexually transmitted diseases were generally incurable, and treatment was limited to treating the symptoms of the disease. The first voluntary hospital for venereal diseases was founded in 1746 at London Lock Hospital. Treatment was not always voluntary: in the second half of the 19th century, the Contagious Diseases Acts were used to arrest suspected prostitutes. In 1924, a number of states concluded the Brussels Agreement, whereby states agreed to provide free or low-cost medical treatment at ports for merchant seamen with venereal diseases. A proponent of these approaches was Dr. Nora Wattie, OBE, Venereal Diseases Officer in Glasgow from 1929, encouraged contact tracing and volunteering for treatment, rather than the prevailing more judgemental view and published her own research on improving sex education and maternity care.

The first effective treatment for a sexually transmitted disease was salvarsan, a treatment for syphilis. With the discovery of antibiotics, a large number of sexually transmitted diseases became easily curable, and this, combined with effective public health campaigns against STIs, led to a public perception during the 1960s and 1970s that they have ceased to be a serious medical threat.

During this period, the importance of contact tracing in treating STIs was recognized. By tracing the sexual partners of infected individuals, testing them for infection, treating the infected and tracing their contacts, in turn, STI clinics could effectively suppress infections in the general population.

In the 1980s, first genital herpes and then AIDS emerged into the public consciousness as sexually transmitted diseases that could not be cured by modern medicine. AIDS, in particular, has a long asymptomatic period—during which time HIV (the human immunodeficiency virus, which causes AIDS) can replicate and the disease can be transmitted to others—followed by a symptomatic period, which leads rapidly to death unless treated. HIV/AIDS entered the United States from Haiti in about 1969. Recognition that AIDS threatened a global pandemic led to public information campaigns and the development of treatments that allow AIDS to be managed by suppressing the replication of HIV for as long as possible. Contact tracing continues to be an important measure, even when diseases are incurable, as it helps to contain infection.

See also
 List of sexually transmitted infections by prevalence

References

Further reading 
 
 
 
 
 
 
  This provides an overview of pre-modern medicine's approach to the diseases.

External links 

 
 
 CDC Sexually Transmitted Diseases Treatment Guidelines, 2010
 STD photo library at Dermnet
 UNFPA: Breaking the Cycle of Sexually Transmitted Infections at UNFPA
 STDs In Color: Sexually Transmitted Disease Facts and Photos
 CDC: Sexually transmitted diseases in the U.S.
 STI Watch: World Health Organization

 
Wikipedia medicine articles ready to translate
Wikipedia emergency medicine articles ready to translate
Mycoplasma
Disease transmission